The Murder Game is a British reality television series that aired on BBC One from March to May 2003. The show was based on the American FOX television show Murder in Small Town X. Though classified as a reality television series, it was more accurately a hybrid of reality TV, game show, and mystery drama. The series was narrated by Rupert Smith. Although there was no host in the traditional sense the Chief, Bob Taylor, acted as a sort of host for the show.

Premise 
In the town of Blackwater a fictional woman named Catherine Prior had been murdered. Ten contestants from the British public were set the challenge of becoming investigators and finding the killer. The investigators were led by Bob Taylor, known as the Chief Investigator or Chief, who was in real life a retired Detective Chief Superintendent from the West Yorkshire Police. The people from the town, played by actors, formed the suspects, some of whom later became victims.

At the beginning of each episode, one investigator would be appointed as the Lead Investigator, who would have specific responsibilities and powers. The investigators would be split into teams by the Lead Investigator, and sent down different lines of inquiry determined by the Chief. These lines of inquiry would involve hidden tests, which the teams would either pass or fail as judged by the Chief.

The Killer's Game 
At some point during the investigation days in each episode, the killer would leave some form of message showcasing two locations, usually accompanied by the taunting words 'coming out to play?'. This signalled the start of each episode's elimination segment, The Killers Game. The investigators were then passed or failed on their lines of enquiry and those who failed were put up for a group vote. Every investigator except the lead investigator could vote and the investigator with the most votes would be chosen as the first person to play the "Game" The Lead Investigator would then choose any investigator to be the second person for the Killer's Game. The two chosen investigators pick from two envelopes to decide who will go to either of the two locations given, for example the first locations for the show were "The Old Oaks" and "The Power Museum". "The Chief" then says to the players that they have one hour to pack their bags and get ready to play the "Killer's Game". In Episode 9, as the finale episode, two killer games were played. The game with the final three had a different approach to the selection process. The Chief decided that the investigators who failed their enquiries the most would play the "Killer's Game".

In the Killer's Game, the two selected investigators would be sent to two different remote locations completely alone, with their movements recorded only by a head-mounted camera and a torch, they also had to follow a map to where the "clue" would be located. One of the chosen investigators would discover an important clue that would help solve the mystery, whereas the other investigator would be eliminated from the show by being "murdered by the killer." The survivor of the two came through the doors at the entrance, notifying that he or she chose correctly and would continue on.

The eliminated contestant would choose the Lead Investigator for the next episode, by means of a pre-recorded "last will and testament".

Story 
By being given £20,000 and the Wilmington Jewel by her father Tony, Catherine plans to leave the town of Blackwater forever taking her daughter Anya with her, but Trevor Dobie heard about Catherine's plans on leaving and started to threaten her, Catherine left home and broke into Jay Wilmington's barge where she would spend the night taking the navigation dividers with her as protection. The following day Goldie was due to marry Jay Wilmington. Catherine was picked on the way to the church by Jennifer Wilmington and she saw that Catherine was wearing the priceless neckless that they thought it was missing, she called Jay to try to get it back but failed. Jay called Goldie and tried to get her to persuade Catherine to give her the necklace but Catherine refused. Meanwhile, Trevor was still pestering Catherine over Anya.

Later Trevor arrived at the church to get Catherine as she practiced for the wedding to admit on camera that he is Anya's father. As he entered the church his phone rang and he rejected the call. The call was from Jay in the phone box calling Trevor to stop hassling Catherine. Jay was the guy in the brown checked shirt seen by witness Edward Green. Jay was wearing the same shirt when Sam, Nick, and Christine saw him at the morgue the day after Catherine was attacked and he said then that he hadn't changed for twenty-four hours. Jay had an alibi without realising it. Trevor demands that Catherine admit that Anya is his daughter which she does. However, she tells him that he's never been a proper father to her and he never will as her and Anya plan to leave Blackwater. When Trevor asks how she can afford to do this she tells him that Tony Wilmington is her father and he has given her the money to get away. Trevor has always hated the Wilmingtons because Felicity Wilmington killed his mother's baby to try to save the family name. He attacks Catherine who tries to defend herself with the navigational dividers she stole from Jay's barge, however Trevor manages to get them off her and use them to stab her. He then took the necklace hoping to use it to frame Jay or Jennifer and he's had the necklace ever since the murder. Why he chose to play the killers game with the investigators is unknown.

Investigators 

The Nuclear Bunker had two locations. Andrew went to the Operational Zone and Nick went to the Living Quarters.

Suspects

Teams

 The team failed their line of inquiry
 The team passed their line of inquiry
 There are no fails nor passes

Voting history 

 A * Indicates there was a tie in the group vote, resulting in a revote between the people who was in said tie.

The first episode included training for the investigators. The Killer's Game was not introduced until episode 2.
Beginning in episode 8, the Lead Investigator was no longer immune from playing the Killer's Game. This meant that he or she would participate in line of inquiries and the group vote.
In the finale, the final three investigators were told how many times they had failed their inquiries. The two with the most played the Killer's Game.
In the finale, the second Killer's Game required the two remaining contestants to declare who they believed to be the killer and why. Melanie answered incorrectly and became the killer's final victim. Andrew answered correctly, solved the case, and won the £25,000 reward.

 The investigator's team passed their line of inquiry.
 The investigator's team failed their line of inquiry.
 The investigator was the lead investigator.
 The investigator was the lead investigator and failed their line of inquiry.
 The investigator was spared from playing the Killer's Game due to having the fewest failed lines of inquiry.
 The investigator played the Killer's game because they did not have the fewest failed lines of inquiry.
 The investigator became the runner-up.
 The investigator won the game.

Sarita* = In both of the first two votes, a tie occurred, first between Sarita and Ruairi, then between Sarita and Meryl. In both cases, a revote was performed, and Sarita received the most votes both times.

Ruairi* = The group vote resulted in a tie between Ruairi and Melanie. As Lead Investigator, Nick broke the tie and sent Ruairi out to play the Killer's Game.

Episodes
{| class="wikitable plainrowheaders" style="width:100%; margin:auto;"
|-
! scope="col" style="width:5%; background:#00A2CF; color:#fff;" | No.
! scope="col" style="width:80%; background:#00A2CF; color:#fff;" | Title
{{Episode list
| EpisodeNumber   = 8
| Title           = Episode 8
| ShortSummary    =

Lead Investigator: Andrew
Note: Due to only four investigators remaining, the Lead Investigator has to join the investigators in the field and as such could be nominated by the group to face the Killer's Game.

Team 1: Melanie and Nick
Day 1: Visit Jennifer Wilmington and confront her with the evidence of Goldie's kidnapping found in the enhanced ransom note tape.
Hidden Test: Spot the date on the newspaper in the back room of Jennifer's shop.

The investigators asked Jennifer about who had access to the shop and if she had seen or heard anything about Jay and Goldie in the last few days. Jennifer provided them with the information that Jay and Trevor had access to the shop and that she had not seen or heard from Jay or Goldie recently. She gave the investigators permission to access the store room, which they believed was the setting for the ransom video but the investigators did not spot that day's paper on the table which would have cast doubt on Jennifer's story about not accessing the store room for several days. Melanie asks Nick if it is a crime scene but Nick incorrectly states that it isn't. The investigators did not confront her with the evidence that Goldie was held in the store room.

Day 2: Set up surveillance at Jennifer's shop observe Jennifer and Trevor. Follow up on Jennifer's alibi.
Hidden Test: Ask for the confirmation of Jennifer's visit to the solicitor.

The investigators are using surveillance to see why Jennifer is scared of Trevor but they are unable to see any behavior from Trevor that would indicate that Jennifer is correct to be concerned about him. They do hear her telling Trevor that she has told the investigators that he was in the store room recently but he questions why she would tell them that when it is not true. Jennifer retaliates by saying she thought she he was in there and tells him that she could have said that he was at the church on the say Catherine was murdered. Trevor confronts her asking why she is telling the investigators things about him and what is her reasoning. Jennifer states that she thinks he should leave.

Upon his exit, the investigators surveillance van is shaken and banged on from the outside. When they attempt to leave they realize they are locked in. The killer has left a message on the van and polaroids of the locations that the next Killer's Game will be played at.

Due to being trapped in the van, the investigators also see Jay enter the shop flustered and trying to make his way to the store room. Jennifer tries to hush him and get him to exit the shop before he can say or do anything as she is aware the shop is under surveillance but Jay is not. Jennifer instructs him to meet her at the local pub and Jay leaves. Jennifer finds the investigators in the van and upon releasing them from being locked inside she confesses to the kidnap and tells them what it was all regarding, which was the necklace. She gives them a potential alibi by saying that she was at her solicitors at the time of the murder.

When the investigators follow this up the solicitor believes she was there earlier than the time stated by Jennifer. However they ask for the visitor log and see that the solicitor had made an error in recalling the time and Jennifer was at the solicitors at the time of the murder, providing her with an alibi.

Result: Fail, the team did not confront Jennifer and failed to spot the significance of the newspaper in the store room.
Team 2: Andrew (as the Lead Investigator) and Richard
Day 1: Search the flooded grain store.
Hidden Test: Keep searching until they find the clue.

At the grain store where Tina’s body was found, they were told that it was flooded with 10 gallons of dirty water. The investigators needed to systematically search it until they found the item that would be the clue that the killer had supposedly hidden in there. The clue was a shredded letter in a bag that was weighed down with a brick. Upon putting the letter back together, it was discovered to have been written by Charles Wilmington for his son Tony and contained the revelation of the existence of the necklace. Charles provided Tony with instructions on passing down the heirloom, informing him to pass it onto a child he trusts before adding that he never approved of Tony's choice in wife therefore implying that Jennifer was not to have it.

Day 2: Visit Tony Wilmington, ask about the Wilmington jewel.
Hidden Test: Find out if copies of Tony's taped conversation with Catherine exist.

Tony Wilmington has taped a conversation with Catherine four or five days before her death, where he tells her about the necklace and its history. He bequeaths it to her but she doesn't think that it would be appropriate as it is a family heirloom and feels it would be better with Jay or Jennifer. He starts to tell her about his relationship with Catherine's mother and she states that she already knows that he is her father. Catherine states that no one else knows about Tony being her father. Tony tries to give her the necklace again but Catherine refuses once more, informing Tony that it would not be good for herself and Anya. Her reasoning is because Trevor wants Anya due to him being her father. Tony states that Trevor will never have any claim on the necklace and he will make a provision in his will to confirm that. He also tells the investigators that he gave her £20,000 to use for a fresh start away from Blackwater.

Before the final briefing team 2 are sent back to Creeksea Place to attend as a fire has broken out. The fire ultimately kills Tony Wilmington as he died in the ambulance on the way to the hospital. However, they are able to get to Tony as he is first rescued from his room and spot that he has a letter in his hand, which they recover as potential evidence. The letter reveals that Jay has heard the contents of the tape before his wedding was due to take place, and the person who enabled him to hear it was Catherine herself.

Result: Fail, the team did not ask if there were copies or who had access to the tape or someone else know about the tape.
Note: Anya has also been interviewed by a family liaison officer and tells the officer when questioned that Goldie (her Aunt) left the house on the day of the murder. The investigators realize that Goldie has lied to them about her whereabouts when the first spoke to her and revealed that Catherine had died.

Killer’s Calling Card As stated above, the surveillance van the investigators were using was being shaken and banged against, once they were able to get out, Polaroids for the next two locations were left, “The Boathouse” and “The Bottling Plant”

Team's Pick": AndrewLocation: The BoathouseLead Investigator's Pick: Richard, for (in the Lead Investigator opinion) not asking relevant questions during Day 2's line of enquiry.Location: The Bottling PlantEliminated: RichardKiller Clue': Andrew returns with a picture of a sort code and account number from a joint account belonging to Gillian "Goldie" Prior and Jay Wilmington.

| LineColor       = 00A2CF
}}
|}

 Production 
The town of Maldon, Essex was used as the fictional town setting of the series, Blackwater (named after the river upon which Maldon resides). The Kelvedon Hatch Secret Nuclear Bunker was also used in the series, where Andrew Weaver and Nick Sykes went to the Operational Zone and Living Quarters respectively during the second-to-last Killer's Game. Before playing the game, the investigators were sent on a four-day training course at the Police Training Centre in Wakefield.

Andrew Weaver won the game, despite being sent to play the Killer's Game six times (Excluding the final Killer's Game against Melanie "Mel" Sainz). He currently holds the record for the most times a person has been sent out the Killer's Game, breaking Kristen Kirchner's record of five times in the US version Murder in Small Town X. Andrew is the only investigator to fail his line of inquiry while being the lead investigator. In addition, he had received the most votes against him throughout the entire season, 10. He correctly identified builder Trevor Dobie as the killer, whereas Melanie chose groom Jay Wilmington. Andrew was sent to the Yacht Club, where Trevor was last seen, and was "invited" To the final killers game at the Construction warehouse, where he found Bob Taylor at the end, who proclaimed him as the winner of the £25,000 grand prize.

 Viewer interaction 
Using Sky, Cable or Freeview, viewers could watch additional parts of the show using BBCi's digital interactive features. One feature entitled Blackwater TV was based around reviewing the case and showing mock television news reports. The React feature was where viewers could vote for who they thought was the killer; the voting results would then be shown the following week. The Investigators section featured exclusive footage from the Chief commenting on the contestants' current handling of the case. The fourth interactive feature was the Case File'' which held all of the details of the case which had currently been uncovered, including timelines, locations, relationships of suspects, and evidence.

References

External links 
 
  (No longer active)
 

BBC Television shows
British television series based on American television series
2003 British television series debuts
2003 British television series endings
2000s British reality television series
English-language television shows
2000s British mystery television series